Pseudometa is a genus of moths in the family Lasiocampidae. The genus was erected by Per Olof Christopher Aurivillius in 1901. The Global Biodiversity Information Facility gives this genus name as a synonym of the spider genus Chrysometa.

Species
Pseudometa andersoni
Pseudometa basalis
Pseudometa canescens
Pseudometa castanea
Pseudometa choba
Pseudometa concava
Pseudometa dollmani
Pseudometa erythrina
Pseudometa jordani
Pseudometa leonina
Pseudometa minima
Pseudometa nigricans
Pseudometa oinopa
Pseudometa pagetodes
Pseudometa patagiata
Pseudometa plinthochroa
Pseudometa punctipennis
Pseudometa schultzei
Pseudometa scythropa
Pseudometa tenebra
Pseudometa thysanodicha
Pseudometa viola

External links

Lasiocampidae